Glossosoma is a genus of little black caddisflies in the family Glossosomatidae. There are more than 110 described species in Glossosoma.

See also
 List of Glossosoma species

References

Further reading

External links

 

Glossosomatidae
Articles created by Qbugbot